Hong Seo-young is a South Korean actress, singer and model. She is known for her roles in dramas such as  The Liar and His Lover, Her Private Life, The Good Detective Season 2 and My Absolute Boyfriend.

Personal life
Hong Seo-young's older brother Hong Min-gi is a volleyball player from Hanyang University later he was scouted by a team of volleyball and he was selected by Hyundai Capital with the 7th pick in the 1st round in the rookie draft ahead of the 2017-18 season.

Discography

Soundtrack appearances

Filmography

Television series

Web series

Theatre

Commercial Ads

Awards and nominations

References

External links 
 
 

1995 births
South Korean stage actresses
South Korean women singers
Living people
21st-century South Korean actresses
South Korean female models
South Korean television actresses
Chung-Ang University alumni